In the United States, a dry county is a county whose government forbids the sale of any kind of alcoholic beverages. Some prohibit off-premises sale, some prohibit on-premises sale, and some prohibit both. Dozens of dry counties exist across the United States, mostly in the South. 

A number of smaller jurisdictions also exist, such as cities, towns, and townships, which prohibit the sale of alcoholic beverages and are known as dry cities, dry towns, or dry townships. Dry jurisdictions can be contrasted with "wet" (in which alcohol sales are allowed and regulated) and "moist" (in which some products or establishments are prohibited and not fully regulated, or a dry county containing wet cities).

Background

History 
In 1906, just over half of U.S. counties were dry. The proportion was larger in some states; for example, in 1906, 54 of Arkansas's 75 counties were completely dry, influenced by the anti-liquor campaigns of the Baptists (both Southern and Missionary) and Methodists.

Although the 21st Amendment repealed nationwide Prohibition in the United States, prohibition under state or local laws is permitted. Prior to and after repeal of nationwide Prohibition, some states passed local option laws granting counties and municipalities, either by popular referendum or local ordinance, the ability to decide for themselves whether to allow alcoholic beverages within their jurisdiction. Many dry communities do not prohibit the consumption of alcohol, which could potentially cause a loss of profits and taxes from the sale of alcohol to their residents in wet (non-prohibition) areas. 

The reason for maintaining prohibition at the local level is often religious in nature, as many evangelical Protestant Christian denominations discourage the consumption of alcohol by their followers (see Christianity and alcohol, sumptuary law, and Bootleggers and Baptists). In Utah, while state law does not allow for dry counties, laws designed to restrict the sale and consumption of alcohol are common in (but not exclusive to) this mostly Mormon state. Consumption of alcohol is discouraged by the Church of Jesus Christ of Latter-day Saints.

A 2018 study of wet and dry counties in the U.S. found that "Even controlling for current religious affiliations, religious composition following the end of national Prohibition strongly predicts current alcohol restrictions."

In rural Alaska, restrictions on alcohol sales are motivated by problems with alcohol use disorder and alcohol-related crime.

Transport 
Since the 21st Amendment repealed nationwide Prohibition in the United States, alcohol prohibition legislation has been left to the discretion of each state, but that authority is not absolute. States within the United States and other sovereign territories were once assumed to have the authority to regulate commerce with respect to alcohol traveling to, from, or through their jurisdictions. However, one state's ban on alcohol may not impede interstate commerce between states who permit it. The Supreme Court of the United States held in Granholm v. Heald (2005) that states do not have the power to regulate interstate shipments of alcoholic beverages. Therefore, it may be likely that municipal, county, or state legislation banning possession of alcoholic beverages by passengers of vehicles operating in interstate commerce (such as trains and interstate bus lines) would be unconstitutional if passengers on such vehicles were simply passing through the area. Following two 1972 raids on Amtrak trains in Kansas and Oklahoma, dry states at the time, the bars on trains passing through the two states closed for the duration of the transit, but the alcohol stayed on board.

Prevalence 
A 2004 survey by the National Alcohol Beverage Control Association found that more than 500 municipalities in the United States are dry, including 83 in Alaska. Of Arkansas's 75 counties, 34 are dry.  36 of the 82 counties in Mississippi were dry or moist  by the time that state repealed its alcoholic prohibition on January 1, 2021, the date it came into force, making all its counties "wet" by default and allowing alcohol sales unless they vote to become dry again through a referendum. In Florida, three of its 67 counties are dry, all of which are located in the northern part of the state, an area that has cultural ties to the Deep South.

Moore County, Tennessee, the home county of Jack Daniel's, a major American producer of whiskey, is a dry county and so the product is not available at stores or restaurants within the county. The distillery, however, sells commemorative bottles of whiskey on site.

Traveling to purchase alcohol
A study in Kentucky suggested that residents of dry counties have to drive farther from their homes to consume alcohol, thus increasing impaired driving exposure, although it found that a similar proportion of crashes in wet and dry counties are alcohol-related. 

Other researchers have pointed to the same phenomenon. Winn and Giacopassi observed that residents of wet counties most likely have "shorter distances (to travel) between home and drinking establishments". From their study, Schulte and colleagues postulate that "it may be counter productive in that individuals are driving farther under the influence of alcohol, thus, increasing their exposure to crashes in dry counties".

Data from the National Highway Traffic and Safety Administration (NHTSA) showed that in Texas, the fatality rate in alcohol-related accidents in dry counties was 6.8 per 10,000 people over a five-year period. That was three times the rate in wet counties: 1.9 per 10,000.

One study in Arkansas noted that wet and dry counties are often adjacent and that alcoholic beverage sales outlets are often located immediately across county or even on state lines. Relatedly, another study in Arkansas previously found—somewhat counterintuitively—that crash fatalities are actually statistically significantly lower in wet as opposed to dry counties, likely due to the distance one must travel in order to access alcohol.

Tax revenue
Another issue a dry city or county may face is the loss of tax revenue because drinkers are willing to drive across city, county or state lines to obtain alcohol. Counties in Texas have experienced this problem, which led to some of its residents to vote towards going wet to see their towns come back to life commercially. Although the idea of bringing more revenue and possibly new jobs to a town may be appealing from an economic standpoint, moral opposition remains present.

Crime 
One study finds that the shift from bans on alcohol to legalization causes an increase in crime. The study finds that "a 10% increase in drinking establishments is associated with a 3 to 5% increase in violent crime. The estimated relationship between drinking establishments and property crime is also positive, although smaller in magnitude".

Dry and moist counties in Kentucky had a higher rate of meth lab seizures than wet counties; a 2018 study of Kentucky counties concluded that "meth lab seizures in Kentucky would decrease by 35% if all counties became wet."

In popular culture

In the 1941 film Sergeant York an early humorous scene depicts a bar that straddles a state border. The Tennessee side is dry so the protagonist is refused a drink so he crosses over to the other end in Kentucky to order a drink.

During the eight-year run of The Andy Griffith Show and the subsequent three-year run of Mayberry R.F.D., the fictional Mayberry County, North Carolina, where Mayberry was located, was established to have been a dry county. However, the program was inconsistent and there were episodes in which there was liquor store in town. A running gag on the show portrayed the Otis Campbell character as constantly ending up in jail due to his drunkenness. Otis was drunk so often, he would let himself into his regular jail cell using a key stored within reach of the jail's two comfortable cells and sleep off the effects of alcohol. Many plots would also involve out-of-town criminals committing alcohol-related crimes, such as running moonshine in Mayberry. Today, the only county in North Carolina that is completely dry is Graham County, which is on the Tennessee border.

In The Simpsons episode "Homer vs. the Eighteenth Amendment", Springfield becomes a dry town after a disastrous Saint Patrick's Day parade and Homer becomes a bootlegger in a parody of Al Capone.

The B-52s' 1989 album Cosmic Thing features a song called "Dry County", which is mainly about not having a lot to do in one. Georgia, which has 159 counties (more than any other state but Texas), is the band's home state and does still have 5 dry counties, although Athens-Clarke County is not one of them.

On Rascal Flatts 2002 album, Melt, it features the song "Dry County Girl." Throughout the song, the lyrics allude to a dry county. For instance, "Her lips won't touch the demon wine, But her eyes are full of pure moonshine, And I get drunk just holding her hand, I get high thinking I could be her man."

See also 
 Dry state
 Alcoholic beverage control state
 List of dry communities by U.S. state
 List of alcohol laws of the United States by state

References 

Alcohol law in the United States
County government in the United States
Prohibition in the United States